Michael "Mick" Gibbins (birth year unknown) is an English former professional rugby league footballer who played in the 1970s and 1980s.

Playing career

County honours
Michael Gibbins won a cap for Yorkshire while at Featherstone Rovers; during the 1979–80 season against Cumbria.

Challenge Cup Final appearances
Michael Gibbins played left-, i.e. number 8, in Featherstone Rovers' 14–12 victory over Hull F.C. in the 1983 Challenge Cup Final during the 1982–83 season at Wembley on Saturday 7 May 1983, in front of a crowd of 84,969.

County Cup Final appearances
Michael Gibbins played left-, i.e. number 8, in Featherstone Rovers' 12–16 defeat by Leeds in the 1976 Yorkshire County Cup Final during the 1976–77 season at Headingley Rugby Stadium, Leeds on Saturday 16 October 1976, and played left-, i.e. number 11, in the 7–17 defeat by Castleford in the 1977 Yorkshire County Cup Final during the 1977–78 season at Headingley Rugby Stadium, Leeds on Saturday 15 October 1977.

Club career
Michael Gibbins made his début for Featherstone Rovers on Tuesday 7 September 1971.

Testimonial match
Michael Gibbins' benefit season/testimonial match at Featherstone Rovers took place during the 1982–83 season.

Honoured at Featherstone Rovers
Michael Gibbins is a Featherstone Rovers Hall of Fame inductee.

Genealogical information
Michael Gibbins is the brother of the rugby league footballer who played in the 1970s for Featherstone Rovers (Heritage № 543); Brian Gibbins.  His step-son, also called Michael "Tugga" Gibbins, played professional rugby league with Dewsbury Rams RLFC

References

External links

Living people
English rugby league players
Featherstone Rovers players
Hull F.C. players
Rugby league props
Rugby league second-rows
Yorkshire rugby league team players
Year of birth missing (living people)
Place of birth missing (living people)